The discography of American recording artist Montell Jordan consists of 8 studio albums and 14 singles.

Studio albums

Singles

Music videos

References

Discographies of American artists
Rhythm and blues discographies